Foolad Arena is a football stadium in Ahvaz, Iran which hosts the Foolad Youth Academy and Foolad Novin, the clubs B team. The stadium was inaugurated in 2007.

References

External links
  Foolad F.C. Official Website

 

Sport in Ahvaz
Buildings and structures in Khuzestan Province
Football venues in Iran